Julia Haart previously Talia Leibov (born April 11, 1971) is an American fashion designer, entrepreneur, and author. She is the former chief executive officer (CEO) of Elite Model Management. Although she has claimed to be a “co-owner” of Elite World Group, a Delaware court ruled that she does not own 50 percent of Elite World Group. She previously owned a namesake shoe collection, and was creative director at Italian luxury house La Perla. Haart is also the subject and executive producer of the Netflix miniseries My Unorthodox Life, which described her decision, in 2013, to leave her Haredi community.

Biography

Early life
Haart was born in Moscow in 1971. She and her parents left Russia when she was 3, and moved to Austin, Texas. In Austin, she attended private school, and was the school's only Jewish student. When Haart was in fourth grade, they moved to Monsey, New York, which has a large Haredi community that appealed to her parents, as they grew more religious.

Haart attended Bais Yaakov Academy in Brooklyn, New York. At 16, she taught herself how to sew, and read fashion magazines in her house. When she was 18, she changed her first name, "to the more Hebrew-sounding Talia, in order to attract a match". At 19, she married her first husband, a yeshiva student, five years her senior.

Leaving the Haredi community
While living as a Haredi Jew throughout the 1990s and early 2000s, Haart became increasingly uncomfortable with her community. The treatment of her younger daughter, Miriam, bothered her in particular. In a 2021 interview with The New York Times, she said that her daughter "just wouldn't conform. They were doing to her what they had done to me — trying to push her down and mold her into that flat person that they could disappear. I couldn't let that happen."

Haart also dealt with mental health issues, telling the Los Angeles Times in an interview that before leaving the community, she had contemplated suicide, but worried about how the stigma within the Haredi community would affect her children's shidduch prospects. After leaving the community, she took on the name Julia Haart. The last name Haart is derived from her maiden name, Leibov, which is similar to Lev, Hebrew for "heart".

Career
Throughout the 1990s and early 2000s, Haart worked as a Judaic Studies teacher at Yeshiva Atlanta; "staff who knew her at the time – when she went by the name Talia Hendler – recalled that she was beloved by students and known for her sharp style". For years, Haart secretly sold life insurance.

After leaving the Haredi community in 2013, Haart founded a shoe company, Julia Haart, with the goal to make shoes that were both fashionable and comfortable. She partnered with a ski boot engineer and a German company that creates a gel used by NASA to create a comfortable high-heeled shoe. 

In 2016, Haart collaborated with La Perla for their Spring and Fall 2016 accessory collections. The same year, she was named as the creative director for the brand by Silvio Scaglia, at that time owner and president of the brand. 

Following her appointment as Creative Director of La Perla, Haart launched a new approach to ready-to-wear for the company. At La Perla, Haart created the first stretch Leavers lace, and launched a collection of ready-to-wear lingerie with built-in support. For her Fall/Winter 2017 fashion show, Haart constructed a "La Perla Manor" runway show, in which Naomi Campbell, Lindsey Wixson, Sasha Pivovarova and Kendall Jenner walked. 

Haart is known for her 2017 Met Gala dress designed for Kendall Jenner. The gown consisted of 85,000 crystals affixed to a single string.
	
In March 2019, she became chief executive officer and chief creative officer of the talent media conglomerate Elite World Group (EWG), also in this case nominated by her ex-husband Silvio Scaglia, owner of the brand. Under Haart's leadership EWG has re-focused the brand and added new divisions. Elite World Group prioritizes assisting models to monetise their brands and business projects. Additionally, Haart is the creative director of e1972, a luxury fashion brand launched by Elite World. The collection received a lot of positive media attention, and was celebrated for its "innovation, inclusivity, and inspiring message of empowerment".

In February 2022, she was fired by her now ex-husband, from her role as group chief executive officer, due to accusations of company embezzlement. Her predecessor Paolo Barbieri was subsequently re-appointed as CEO.

Legal battles 
Following her dismissal from EWG, Haart sued Scaglia in Delaware's Chancery Court, where Freedom Holding Inc, which owns EWG's shares, resides. Haart claimed she is a 50–50 owner of EWG and due to this holds equal shares in the company, and therefore could not be dismissed.

On August 4, 2022, Vice Chancellor Morgan T. Zurn of the Delaware Chancery Court issued a definitive, final ruling that confirmed Silvio Scaglia is the controlling shareholder of Elite World Group (EWG)’s parent company, Freedom Holding Inc., and that Julia Haart was properly terminated as CEO of EWG in February 2022.

Ultimately, the court found that, "Haart did not and does not own fifty percent of Freedom’s preferred stock" and that she was "powerless" to stop Freedom from firing her. As a consequence of the court ruling, Haart has been determined to own only 50 Freedom shares out of a total of more than 123,000. In the 52-page opinion responding to Haart's contention that Scaglia has "unclean hands," Zurn explained the exact opposite was demonstrated at trial: "the exercise of looking at the litigants’ hands reveals dirt on Haart’s."

On August 11, 2022, the New York Supreme Court issued a decision following a six-day trial in April regarding Julia Haart's claims of spousal abuse by Silvio Scaglia. In the decision, Justice Douglas Hoffman, dismissed Ms. Haart's causes of action and denied her request for an order of protection. The Court heard extensive cross-examinations of both parties and Ms. Haart's daughter, reviewed hundreds of pages of WhatsApp messages exchanged between the parties over a three-year period, and listened to hours of recordings and voice messages. In its 29-page decision, the Court determined that Ms. Haart's abuse allegations were false, that her original family offense petition was "misleading" and found hers and her daughter's testimony to be "not credible".  Instead, the Court concluded that Haart filed her petition and publicized her false allegations in retaliation for having been fired as CEO of Mr. Scaglia's company, Elite World Group ("EWG"), and in a bid to gain exclusive occupancy of his $65 million penthouse apartment at 70 Vestry Street.

Personal life 
Haart has four children with her first husband, Yosef Hendler: Batsheva, Shlomo, Miriam, and Aron. Batsheva, who goes by the last name Haart, is an aspiring social media influencer who was married to Binyamin "Ben" Weinstein from 2012 until their divorce in November 2021. Miriam has also adopted her mother's last name Haart. Aron, who is in high school, splits his time between his parents in Manhattan and Monsey, New York.

In June 2019, Haart married Swiss entrepreneur and billionaire Silvio Scaglia. 

In February 2022, Haart filed for divorce, and was terminated from her chief executive officer position on the same day.

Haart is the eldest of eight children, one of whom died in a car accident at age 5. Only one of her siblings, a sister named Hannah, has a relationship with her; her parents and other siblings stopped talking to her after she left her Orthodox community.

My Unorthodox Life

Haart is the subject of the Netflix series My Unorthodox Life, which premiered in July 2021. The documentary series follows the professional and personal life of Haart in her role as chief executive officer of Elite World Group, author, mother and wife. The show has been received critically by many Jewish community members.

In 2022, the Jewish Journal named Haart one of "The Top 10 Jewish Reality TV Stars of All Time."

References

Living people
1971 births
American fashion designers
20th-century American Jews
American people of Russian-Jewish descent
Former Orthodox Jews
Haredim
People from Austin, Texas
People from New York City
Russian Jews
Anti-Orthodox Judaism sentiment
21st-century American Jews